Istvan Moldvai (born 13 April 1974) is a Romanian former water polo player who competed in the 1996 Summer Olympics.

References

1974 births
Living people
Romanian male water polo players
Olympic water polo players of Romania
Water polo players at the 1996 Summer Olympics